Henry Smith Farmstead is a historic home located at Huntington Station in Suffolk County, New York. It is a 2-story, three-bay clapboard dwelling with a -story, three-bay south wing.  It was built about 1750 and remodelled in the 1860s.  Also on the property are a barn, privy, and three sheds.

It was added to the National Register of Historic Places in 1985.

References

External links
Henry Smith Farmstead (LandmarkHunter.com)
Henry Smith Farmstead (Facebook)
John Gardiner Farm (Greenlawn-Centerport Historical Association)

Houses on the National Register of Historic Places in New York (state)
Houses completed in 1750
Houses in Suffolk County, New York
National Register of Historic Places in Suffolk County, New York